The Petäjävesi Old Church is a wooden church located in Petäjävesi, Finland. It was built between 1763 and 1765, when Tavastia was still a part of Sweden. The bell tower was built in 1821. It was inscribed in 1994 on the UNESCO World Heritage List for its testimony to the wooden church architecture of the Nordic countries.

It is a popular church for weddings in the summer, and there is a church service on most Sundays.

History and Construction
The church was built as the chapel for the area of Petäjävesi, which has belonged to the congregation of Jämsä. The local people had been given the permission to build a graveyard and a small village church at their own expense by the crown as early as in 1728 because the trip to the nearest church in Jämsä was long, however it took about 35 years until the construction began. The church was planned and built by Jaakko Klemetinpoika Leppänen, a church builder from Vesanka. In 1821 the windows were enlarged and the sacristy was moved from the northern part of the church to the east. The bell tower was also added by Erkki Leppänen, the grandson of the original builder. The church went out of use in 1879 when the new church was built.

Architecture
Originally built entirely of pine logs, the old church has retained its original appearance and its interior decoration exceptionally well. The church demonstrates influences from the Gothic, Renaissance, and Baroque architectural styles. The cross-type floor plan of the church, with similar-sized arms, came into use in the Nordic countries at the end of the 17th century and became common in the 18th century in the countryside churches. However, the high roof resembles the earlier Gothic style, and the octagonal roof with a circular design is derived from the oculus of Renaissance architecture. The interior of the church is likewise well-preserved from its use during the 18th and 19th centuries. The pulpit, pews, galleries, and chandeliers were all hand-carved by local craftsmen from pine wood.

From forgotten to world heritage
After the new church was built, the old remained abandoned for a long time. Only the cemetery around the church and the belltower were in use. In the 1920s a Polish-Austrian art historian Josef Strzygowski noticed the architectural and historical value of the church and since 1929 it has been restored several times. In 1994 it was approved in the UNESCO's World Heritage Sites representing typical eastern Scandinavian wooden church tradition.

References

External links
 
 Petäjävesi Old Church; World Heritage website
 Petäjävesi town council information about the Old Church
 Petäjävesi church congregation

Churches completed in 1765
18th-century churches in Finland
Towers completed in 1821
World Heritage Sites in Finland
Landmarks in Finland
Wooden churches in Finland
Gothic architecture in Finland
Buildings and structures in Central Finland
Tourist attractions in Central Finland Region
Old Church
Lutheran churches in Finland